Triglochin is a plant genus in the family Juncaginaceae described by Carl Linnaeus in 1753. It is very nearly cosmopolitan in distribution, with species on every continent except Antarctica. North America has four accepted species, two of which can also be found in Europe: Triglochin palustris (marsh arrowgrass) and Triglochin maritima (sea arrowgrass). Australia has many more.

The most widely used common name for the genus is arrowgrass, although these plants are not really grasses. Many of the common names for species make use of the term "arrowgrass", although there are exceptions: T. procera, for example, is commonly known as water ribbons.

Arrowgrasses are used as food plants by the larvae of some Lepidoptera species including the grey chi moth.

Description 
This genus contains marsh herbs with flat or cylindrical leaves.

The inflorescences are spikes or racemes. The flowers have two bracts. Each flower has three or six herbaceous and deciduous perianth segments. Three to six stamens are connected at the base of the perianth segments and fall with the perianths. There are three to six carpels with a one chambered ovary containing a single ovule. The styles are short and may be fused at the base. The stigmas are often stalkless and plumose.

The fruits have 3-6 free or fused curved follicles or achenes (small, dry, one seeded fruits with a loose covering)that break away from a persistent three winged axis. The seed is erect with a straight embryo.

Species 
The following species are accepted: 

formerly included
now in other genera: Bulbine, Cycnogeton and  Tetroncium 
Triglochin alcockiae – Cycnogeton alcockiae – Australia
Triglochin dubia – Cycnogeton dubium – Australia, New Guinea
Triglochin huegelii – Cycnogeton huegelii – Western Australia
Triglochin linearis – Cycnogeton lineare – Western Australia
Triglochin magellanica – Tetroncium magellanicum – Tierra del Fuego, Falkland Is, Gough I
Triglochin maundii – Maundia triglochinoides – Australia
Triglochin microtuberosa – Cycnogeton microtuberosum – Australia
Triglochin multifructa – Cycnogeton multifructum – Australia
Triglochin procera – Cycnogeton procerum – Australia
Triglochin pterocarpa – Cycnogeton dubium – Australia, New Guinea
Triglochin racemosa – Bulbine semibarbata – Australia
Triglochin reflexa – Tetroncium magellanicum – Tierra del Fuego, Falkland Is, Gough I
Triglochin rheophila – Cycnogeton rheophilum – Australia
Triglochin triglochinoides – Maundia triglochinoides – Australia

References

External links
Triglochin in the Flora of North America
USDA: Triglochin concinna [in the Flora of North America this is treated as a synonym of Triglochin maritima]

Juncaginaceae
Alismatales genera
Taxa named by Carl Linnaeus
Taxa named by Aimé Bonpland